The rivière au Tonnerre (English: Thunder River) is a watercourse that runs through the municipality of Rivière-au-Tonnerre, Quebec in the Minganie Regional County Municipality (RCM), in the Côte-Nord administrative region, in Quebec, in Canada.
The course of the river crosses the township of Margane, then constitutes the boundary between the townships of Margane and Touzel until the confluence of the river with the North shore of the Gulf of Saint Lawrence.

Location

It has many rapids in its headwaters.
The mouth of the river is located in the municipality of Rivière-au-Tonnerre in the Minganie Regional County Municipality.
The widening at the mouth, which is halfway between Sept-Îles and Havre-Saint-Pierre, forms a natural harbor for small craft that is accessed from the sea through a narrow channel.
The community of Rivière-au-Tonnerre is on both sides of the river mouth, which is crossed by Quebec Route 138.

The southern portion of the "Tonnerre River" hydrographic slope is served by Route 138 along the north shore of the Gulf of Saint Lawrence. The R0902 forest road (going north-west) serves the western part of this slope.
The surface of the "Thunder River" is usually frozen from early November to the end of April, however, safe ice circulation is generally from late November to mid-April.

Description

The Dictionnaire des rivières et lacs de la province de Québec (1914) describes the river as,

Name

The Innu call the river U`suk `Sipo, meaning red-breasted merganser (Mergus serrator), a common bird species on the North Shore.
This is spelled "Ouchigouchipi" in the maps by Jacques-Nicolas Bellin (1744) and Robert de Vaugondy (1755).
In his 1776 map Captain Carver writes the name as "Ouchigoush-ipi". 
The spelling "Uhukuhîpu" has also been used by anthropologists.
The name "Thunder R." appears on the 1853 map by Bouchette fils, and as "R. au Tonnere" on the maps by Taché (1870 and 1880).

Basin

It lies between the basins of the Sheldrake to the west and the Jupitagon to the east.
Part of the basin is in the unorganized territory of Lac-Jérôme and part in the municipality of Rivière-au-Tonnerre.
A map of the ecological regions of Quebec shows the river basin is in sub-regions 6j-S, 6j-T and 6m-T of the east spruce/moss subdomain.

See also 
Rivière-au-Tonnerre, Quebec,
Minganie Regional County Municipality (RCM)
Côte-Nord, administrative region
List of rivers of Quebec

Notes

Citations

Sources

Rivers of Côte-Nord
Minganie Regional County Municipality
Tonnerre